KMVL (1220 AM) is a radio station broadcasting an adult standards format. KMVL is licensed, along with its 2 FM translators, to Madisonville, Texas. KMVL is owned by Leon Hunt and is co-owned with its FM sister station, KMVL-FM, also licensed to Madisonville.

1220 AM is a Mexican clear-channel frequency, on which XEB in Mexico City is the dominant Class A station.

Translator

History
KMVL commenced broadcasting on March 1, 1988.

KMVL was synchrocast on an experimental license co-channel in Huntsville, Texas, as KM2XVL, which ran 170 watts during the day and 11 watts at night. The Huntsville facility was licensed in 2000, and was located off of Phelps Drive, east of Sam Houston State, and U.S. Highway 190. KM2XVL's license was cancelled by the Federal Communications Commission on August 2, 2021.

References

External links

Adult standards radio stations in the United States
MVL